Sitting-in-the-bed (Tibetan: ཁྲི་ལ་བཞུགས khri la bzhugs, zuo chuang ) is a major religious ceremony in Tibetan Buddhist temples. It is a necessary ceremony for the reincarnated person to formally succeed the living Buddha by the reincarnated soul boy and change the name during the inheritance process of the living Buddha.

The main content of sitting on the bed is to respect the ancestors of Tibetan Buddhism sects, and Songtsen Gampo, Princess Wencheng, Padmasambhava, and the goddess Bailangmu.

For important lamas including the Dalai Lamas and Panchen Lamas, sitting-in-the-bed ceremony happens after Golden Urn ceremony and approval from the Central Government. Sitting-in-the-bed ceremony for the 10th Dalai Lama was held in the Potala Palace.  Sitting-in-the-bed ceremony for the 13th Dalai Lama was held in the Potala Palace.

See also
Golden Urn
The Discourse of Lama

References

Tibetan Buddhist practices
Tibetan culture
Buddhist rituals